R v Secretary of State for Foreign and Commonwealth Affairs, ex p Rees-Mogg was an English legal case in which Times journalist and life peer William Rees-Mogg, challenged the legality of the Maastricht Treaty by judicial review. The case was based on Rees-Mogg's call for a declaration that by ratifying the Treaty on the EU, the Government transferred certain prerogative powers without statutory authority.

The case is notable for its liberal approach to the question of locus standi in judicial review cases.
The principle of parliamentary sovereignty will not therefore be affected since such making of treaty does not change any domestic law.

External links
 Judgment on BAILII

United Kingdom administrative case law
High Court of Justice cases
1993 in case law
1993 in British law
Foreign, Commonwealth and Development Office
Euroscepticism in the United Kingdom